Mission to Hell is a 1964 German-French-Italian spy film written and directed by Gianfranco Parolini and starring Paul Hubschmid. One of the first Eurospy productions, it was a box office success.

Plot

Cast

References

External links

Mission to Hell at Variety Distribution

1964 films
1960s spy thriller films
West German films
German spy thriller films
French spy thriller films
Italian spy thriller films
Films directed by Gianfranco Parolini
Films shot in Bangkok
1960s German-language films
Thai-language films
1960s English-language films
1960s German films
1960s Italian films
1960s French films